(Kappa Alpha Pi) was a high school fraternity founded in 1904 at Englewood High School in Chicago, Illinois.

History 
On June 11, 1902, nine men at Englewood High School in Chicago, Illinois formed a club known as the Harvard Athletic Club. The club was organized for the purpose of fostering sports in the school. They designed a club pin that was a crimson diamond with a white "H" in the middle. Soon after the formation of the Harvard Athletics Club, the men constructed a cinder track near the school where they trained for track events.

In the years prior to the formation of the Harvard Athletics Club, several high school fraternities had been founded in the Chicago area, and their popularity had grown tremendously. Omicron Kappa Pi was founded in 1893, and Beta Zeta Phi and Delta Sigma were founded in 1897. As a result of issues caused by the growing popularity of these organizations, the administration at Englewood gave numerous lectures warning against membership in fraternities, exemplifying the pitfalls and disgrace that came with membership in such organizations. The lectures against fraternity membership piqued the interest of the men of the Harvard Athletics Club, and they decided that they would like to become a fraternity. On December 31, 1903, they changed the name of their group to the Harvards, with the intention of becoming a fraternity.

On March 7, 1904, the Harvards reorganized as Kappa Alpha Pi Fraternity. The men involved at the time of reorganization are credited as being the founders of Kappa Alpha Pi. Those men were Chauncey M. Briggs, Harold R. Cossitt, U. Lloyd Hendrick, Merwin O. Hopkins, Fred G. Lee, William H. McCord, H. Russell Sherwood, R. Clifford Sherwood, and George H. Wright.

With the intention of becoming a national fraternity, Kappa Alpha Pi petitioned the State of Illinois for a charter, and it was granted, in November 1905. By 1930, Kappa Alpha Pi had more than 50 chapters across the United States, with the heaviest concentration in Illinois and California.

As the institution of high school fraternities began to die off, most chapters of Kappa Alpha Pi were inactive by the 1960s.

Chapters

† The original Zeta Chapter at Muncie, Indiana gave up its charter in 1909, and the Phi Gamma Chapter was founded soon after as a replacement.
†† Rho Chapter was moved to Southwest High School after World War I.

References

Student organizations established in 1904
High school fraternities and sororities
Fraternities and sororities in the United States
1904 establishments in Illinois